Estadio Julio Humberto Grondona, or the Estadio Viaducto, is a multi-use stadium in Sarandí, Argentina.  It is currently used primarily for football matches and is the home stadium of Arsenal de Sarandí.

The stadium holds 18,300 people. Estadio Julio H. Grondona is famous for its "chinchulines" (chitterlings), a popular Argentinian food sold by many vendors.

External links
Stadium information

References

Julio H. Grondona
Arsenal de Sarandí
1964 establishments in Argentina